The La Grande-4 (LG-4) is a hydroelectric generating station on the La Grande River in Quebec, Canada that is part of Hydro-Québec's James Bay Project. The station can generate 2,779 MW and was commissioned in 1984–1986. It generates electricity through the reservoir and dam system.

See also 

 List of largest power stations in Canada
 List of hydroelectric stations in Quebec
 Reservoirs and dams in Canada

James Bay Project
Dams in Quebec
Dams completed in 1986
Dams on the La Grande River
Publicly owned dams in Canada